The 2022–23 season is the 115th in the history of SSV Jahn Regensburg and their sixth consecutive season in the second division. The club participates in the 2. Bundesliga and the DFB-Pokal where they were eliminated in the second round.

Players

Out on loan

Transfers

In

Out

Pre-season and friendlies

Competitions

Overall record

2. Bundesliga

League table

Results summary

Results by round

Matches 
The league fixtures were announced on 17 June 2022.

DFB-Pokal

Statistics
.

|}

References

SSV Jahn Regensburg seasons
Jahn Regensburg